Deathstroke may refer to:

 Deathstroke, a fictional character featured in DC Comics books
 Deathstroke, the name of multiple characters appearing in the Arrowverse television franchise:
 Billy Wintergreen (Arrowverse)
 Slade Wilson (Arrowverse)
 Grant Wilson (Arrowverse)
 John Diggle Jr.
 "Deathstroke" (Arrow episode), an episode of Arrow
 Deathstroke (film), a film in production by Warner Bros.
 "Deathstroke" (Titans episode)
 Deathstroke (Titans character)